The Olkaria VI Geothermal Power Station, also known as the Olkaria VI Geothermal Power Plant, is a power station under construction in Kenya, with an electric capacity of 140 megawatts. The plant will be developed under a public private partnership (PPP) model, where the state-owned Kenya Electricity Generating Company (KenGen) will co-own the power station with a strategic partner.

Location
Olkaria VI would sit adjacent to Olkaria II Geothermal Power Station.

Overview
The Olkaria VI power station is designed to generate 140 MW, to be sold directly to Kenya Power and Lighting Company (KenyaPower), for integration into the Kenyan grid. About  from the site of Olkaria VI, lies a 220kV substation, where the output from this power station will be directed for evacuation.

KenGen has drilled and tested steam holes and prepared the site where the power station will be built. When a strategic partner is identified and selected, an ad hoc special purpose vehicle (SPV) company will be formed, with KenGen owning 25 percent of the SPV.

Developers
In May 2020, KenGen concluded the first bidding round for the selection of the strategic partner. Four companies and one consortium were selected to proceed to the second round of bidding. The five entities are listed in the table below.

Notes: The Engie/Toyota Consortium comprises (a) Engie Energy Services of the United Kingdom (b) Toyota Tsusho Corporation of Japan (c) Kyuden International Corporation and (d) DL Koisagat Tea Estate.

Operations
The plan calls for the strategic partner to own, finance, build, operate and maintain the power station for the duration of the PPP contract. At the end of that contract, ownership would revert to KenGen. During the contract period, KenGen would be responsible for supplying the steam required to run the power station.

See also

List of power stations in Kenya
Geothermal power in Kenya
Olkaria I Geothermal Power Station
Olkaria II Geothermal Power Station
Olkaria III Geothermal Power Station
Olkaria IV Geothermal Power Station
Olkaria V Geothermal Power Station

References

External links
How Kenya is harnessing the immense heat from the Earth As of 4 March 2021.

Geothermal power stations in Kenya
Nakuru County
Proposed energy infrastructure
Buildings and structures in Kenya